The International Society for Science and Religion (ISSR) is a learned society established in 2001 for the purpose of the promotion of education through the support of inter-disciplinary learning and research in the fields of science and religion conducted where possible in an international and multi-faith context. The Society took shape after a four-day conference in Granada, Spain.

Membership
Membership is available to all interested persons. However, Fellowship is only attained through nomination by existing Fellows only. There were 97 founding members, including five Fellows of the Royal Society.

Varieties of faith tradition
Although many of the founders of the ISSR are Christians, the society actively welcomes members from other faith traditions. The book Why the Science and Religion Dialogue Matters produced by the society has major contributions from:
 John Polkinghorne, George Ellis, Holmes Rolston III and Fraser Watts (who are Christians), on why the science and religion dialogue matters
 Carl Feit on Judaism
 Munawar Anees on Islam
 B.V. Subbarayappa on Hinduism
 Trinh Xuan Thuan on Buddhism
 Heup Young Kim on Asian Christianity

Presidents
The Presidents of the ISSR have been:
 John Polkinghorne (Founding President)
 George Ellis
 Sir Brian Heap
 John Hedley Brooke
Michael J. Reiss (Current President)

Secretariat
The society’s central office is based at St. Edmund's College at the University of Cambridge.  The Executive Secretary is Professor Fraser Watts.

Opposition to intelligent design
In 2008 the ISSR released a statement declaring "that intelligent design is neither sound science nor good theology."

See also
 Science and religion
 Issues in Science and Religion by Ian Barbour

Notes and references

External links 
 Official Website

Religion and science
International learned societies